Hergenroth is a municipality in Westerwaldkreis district, Rhineland-Palatinate, in western Germany.

People named "Hergenröther" may well have come from this town.

References 

Municipalities in Rhineland-Palatinate
Westerwaldkreis